Angela Brown (born 1963) is an American dramatic soprano.

Angie Brown (born 1963) is a British singer-songwriter.

Angela or Angie Brown(e) may also refer to:
 Angela Browne (1938–2001), British actress
 Angela Brown (Hollyoaks), a character in the British television soap opera
 Angela Browne (nun) (1884–?), Irish Australian nun
 Angela Gisela Brown (born 1958), Panamanian princess of Liechtenstein
 Angela Laverne Brown (born 1961), American recording artist, producer, and actress known as Angie Stone
 Angela Brown (athlete), American long jumper who ranked second in the 1999 Pan American Games
 Angela Brown (writer), nominated in the 17th Lambda Literary Awards

See also
 Angela Brown-Burke, Jamaican politician
 Angela Browning (born 1946), British politician